The Omega Chapter of the Chi Phi Fraternity is a historic fraternity house located at the Georgia Institute of Technology (Georgia Tech) in Atlanta, Georgia, United States. The building was added to the National Register of Historic Places in 1982.

History 
In 1902, the Chi Phi fraternity began to investigate the possibility of a presence at the Georgia School of Technology (now Georgia Institute of Technology, commonly known as Georgia Tech) in Atlanta. By 1904, there were eight members at Tech and on June 2 of that year, the Omega Chapter at the school was officially chartered. In 1927, Omega Chapter members began to raise funds for the construction of a new fraternity house, which was constructed between June 1928 and Fall 1929. On June 17, 1982, this building was added to the National Register of Historic Places.

See also 

 List of Chi Phi chapters
 List of fraternities and sororities at Georgia Institute of Technology
 Main campus of the Georgia Institute of Technology
 National Register of Historic Places listings in Fulton County, Georgia

References

External links 
 

1929 establishments in Georgia (U.S. state)
Brick buildings and structures
Fraternity and sorority houses
Georgia Tech buildings and structures
National Register of Historic Places in Atlanta
Residential buildings completed in 1929
Residential buildings in Atlanta
Residential buildings on the National Register of Historic Places in Georgia (U.S. state)